The Art of Failure: Chuck Connelly Not for Sale, a documentary television film directed by Jeff Stimmel, premiered at the L.A. Film Festival in June 2008 and was shown on HBO in July.

Synopsis
The documentary chronicles the artist Chuck Connelly as he struggles with his temperament, alcoholism, and disillusionment with reality. These factors culminate in the alienation of gallery owners, collectors, and his wife; serving to depress Connelly further. The documentary details the tragedy of the fallen artist as he fights to maintain his dignity and integrity in the face of a world that refuses to accept him.

Awards
The documentary won an Emmy at the 30th annual event in 2009 for the 'Outstanding Arts & Culture Programming' category.

References
30th Annual News & Documentary Emmy Awards Winners

External links
 HBO Documentaries Synopsis
 
The Art of Failure: Chuck Connelly Not for Sale at Docsville - https://www.docsville.com/watch/25d75af3-5759-4a82-94e9-26ca00e50527

2008 television films
2008 films
American television films
American documentary films
Documentary films about painters
2008 documentary films
2000s English-language films
2000s American films